Reginald Nicholson (15 July 1869 – 27 April 1946) was an English Liberal Party politician.

He was elected at the 1918 general election as a Coalition Liberal Member of Parliament (MP) for Doncaster in the West Riding of Yorkshire. He was Parliamentary Private Secretary to the Under-Secretary of State for Air from 1919 to 1920, but was defeated at the 1922 general election by the Labour Party candidate Wilfred Paling, and did not stand again.

Nicholson was the son of the William Norris Nicholson and his wife Emily (née Daniel). He was educated at Charterhouse, and later became Traffic Manager of the Bengal-Nagpur Railway. He was Manager of The Times newspaper from 1911 to 1915. On 15 February 1915, he married Natalie Stark Pearson (1889–1956), daughter of Frederick Stark Pearson. They had two sons, David Benevenuto Nicholson (1916–1937) and Peter Anthony Nicholson (1923–2001).

References

External links 
 

1869 births
1946 deaths
Liberal Party (UK) MPs for English constituencies
UK MPs 1918–1922
People educated at Charterhouse School
The Times people
National Liberal Party (UK, 1922) politicians